Joseph Reeves Hyde III (born 1942), known as Pitt Hyde, is an American entrepreneur and philanthropist in Memphis, Tennessee. He is best known for founding AutoZone as a spinoff of his family's grocery business, Malone and Hyde, in 1979. Hyde is also a part-owner of the Memphis Grizzlies.

Hyde graduated from the University of North Carolina with a degree in economics.   He is a member of Presbyterian Church  and studied in Presbyterian Day School.

Together with his wife, Barbara Rosser Hyde, Pitt runs the Hyde Family Foundation which works for the betterment of Memphis through hands-on philanthropy.

Awards and honors
1998 Golden Plate Award of the American Academy of Achievement
2002 AXA Liberty Bowl Distinguished Citizen Award
2004 Automotive Hall of Fame
2007 Francis Gassner Award of the Memphis chapter of the American Institute of Architects
The Society of Entrepreneurs Hall of Honor

References

1942 births
People from Memphis, Tennessee
Living people
American Presbyterians
University of North Carolina at Chapel Hill alumni
20th-century American businesspeople